Beatrice Rwakimari (born 21 May 1961) is a Ugandan public health leader, public administrator, teacher and politician. She was the elected Woman MP for Ntungamo District in Uganda's tenth parliament and was politically affiliated to NRM, the ruling political party in Uganda. She previously served the constituency for two consecutive terms in the 7th and 8th parliaments from 2001 to 2011. In the 10th Parliament, she served as a member of the Appointments Committee, the Committee on Health  and the NRM Parliamentary Caucus.

She was replaced by Joseline Baata Kamateneti in the 2021 general elections

See also 
Ntungamo District
Parliament of Uganda
National Resistance Movement

References

External links 
 Website of the Parliament of Uganda

Living people
1961 births
Members of the Parliament of Uganda
People from Ntungamo District
People from Western Region, Uganda
Active politicians
Makerere University alumni
Uganda Christian University alumni
21st-century Ugandan women politicians
21st-century Ugandan politicians
Women members of the Parliament of Uganda